Iiris Vesik (born 16 July 1991), better known as simply Iiris, is an Estonian singer, songwriter, and stage actress. Her debut album The Magic Gift Box was released in March 2012 under EMI Music Finland.
She's also the singer of the group Night Tapes.

Life and career

Early life
Vesik began attending Jakob Westholmi Gümnaasium in 1998, and later graduated in 2010. She has a younger brother and two younger half-sisters.

She began her music career after placing third in the Estonian singing competition Tähtede laul in 2003. Vesik went on to place third again in the televised Estonian singing competition Kaks Takti Ette in 2007.

Music career
Vesik has competed to represent Estonia in the Eurovision Song Contest on three occasions. In 2008, her song "Ice-Cold Story", written by Riine Pajusaar, placed second in the Eurolaul competition. In 2010 she returned with the self-composed song "Astronaut", placing fourth in the Eesti Laul competition. In 2016, along with Cartoon, Kerli & Kristel Aaslaid she was one of the writers for "Immortality" performed by Cartoon and Kristel Aaslaid at Eesti Laul 2016. She competed with Agoh in Eesti Laul 2018 with the song “Drop That Boogie” and placed 5th in the final.

2010 was a year that rocketed Iiris into the spotlight. After the showcase festival Tallinn Music Week, Iiris got people talking. “Especially good performance and great songwriting”, said Dietmar Schwenger of the MusikWoche. Invitations from festivals like Popkomm (Germany), Musiikki & Media (Finland), The Great Escape (UK), Positivus (Latvia) and Iceland Airwaves (Iceland) followed soon.

At the beginning of 2011 Iiris became the artist of the week on MTV Iggy’s blog – “A depressingly few amount of bands have “it.” In fact, I’m pretty sure I didn’t know what “it” was, until I listened to Estonian singer/songwriter/pianist Iiris. Because whatever “it” is, she definitely has it. Iiris has the eclecticism, the smarts, the innovation, the pop sound, not to mention the adorable/pretty image to become a huge mega mega, mega star.”

Iiris was signed to EMI Finland in June 2011. Her debut album The Magic Gift Box, produced by Ago Teppand (a.k.a. Sethh), was released on 28 March 2012.

Iiris is often compared to Estonian pop singer Kerli, and they are both fans of each other.

After Universal Music Group bought EMI, Iiris has been releasing her songs on Universal Music Finland.

Musical style
Iiris is frequently compared to artists such as Björk, Florence & The Machine, Kate Bush, Kerli and Regina Spektor.

Discography
Studio albums
 The Magic Gift Box (2012, EMI Music Finland/Virgin Records)

EPs
 Chinaberry Girl  (2013, Universal Music Group)
 Hope (2016, Dreamweaver)
 Dream Forever In Glorious Stereo (20I9) (with Night Tapes)
 Download Spirit (2020) (with Night Tapes)

Singles
 "Ice-Cold Story" (Audiosus, 2007)
 "Alien" (Rockhouse, 2008)
 "Astronaut" (Sethh Sound, 2010)
 "Melyse" (EMI Music Finland, 2011)
 "Weirdo" (EMI Music Finland, 2012)
 "Tigerhead" (Universal Music Finland, 2013)
 "Iiridescent Love" (Hand In Hive U.K, 2015)
 "Hope" (Dreamweaver, 2016)
 "Stranger" (Dreamweaver, 2017)

Awards and nominations 

|-
| rowspan="1" | 2010
| Herself
| Skype "Go Change The World Award" @ TMW
| 
|-
| rowspan="1" | 2012
| "Melyse"
| Estonian Music Award for Best Music Video
| 
|-
| rowspan="5" | 2013
| rowspan="3" | The Magic Gift Box
| Estonian Music Award for Best Album
| 
|-
| Estonian Music Award for Best Debut Album
| 
|-
| Estonian Music Award for Best Pop Album
| 
|-
| rowspan="1" | Herself
| Estonian Music Award for Best Female Artist
| 
|-
| "Weirdo"
| Estonian Music Award for Best Music Video
| 
|-
| rowspan="1" | 2014
| "Tigerhead"
| Estonian Music Award for Best Music Video
|

References

External links
 

1991 births
Living people
21st-century Estonian women singers
Estonian stage actresses
Estonian child actresses
Estonian child singers
Indie pop musicians
Synth-pop singers
21st-century Estonian actresses
Alumni of Goldsmiths, University of London
Eesti Laul contestants